Dr. Robert B. McNutt House is a historic home located at Princeton, Mercer County, West Virginia.  The original section was built about 1840, and is a classic I house configuration, with a two-story, three-bay main facade and a one-bay-wide, two-story centered portico. Later additions include a one-story, hip-roofed section and a two-story ell.  The portico has curvilinear brackets and a second story railing in the Gothic Revival style.  The house sits on a random ashlar sandstone foundation. Also on the property is a contributing stone storage building / well house.  The house was used as a headquarters and field hospital by the Union Army in the spring of 1862.

It was listed on the National Register of Historic Places in 2001.

References

Houses on the National Register of Historic Places in West Virginia
Gothic Revival architecture in West Virginia
Houses completed in 1840
Houses in Mercer County, West Virginia
National Register of Historic Places in Mercer County, West Virginia
1840 establishments in Virginia
Princeton, West Virginia